2nd Warsaw Infantry Division of Henryk Dąbrowski (2 Warszawska Dywizja Piechoty im. Henryka Dąbrowskiego) was formed in 1943 as part of the Polish First Army alongside the Red Army of the Soviet Union. It fought near Vistula and Warsaw, at Pomerania and in the Battle of Berlin. It was mostly disbanded during reorganization in 1956, with traditions inherited by the 2nd Warsaw Mechanized Division (itself based also on the 7th Infantry Division).

References 

Military units and formations established in 1943
1st Infantry
Military units and formations disestablished in 1956
1943 establishments in Poland
1956 disestablishments in Poland